Robert Wu is an American actor, producer and writer.  He played Ming, who transforms into a version of "Ming the Merciless", the arch-enemy of Flash Gordon, (during an hallucination that Sam J. Jones, the actor who plays Flash Gordon has) in Seth MacFarlane's film, Ted (2012). He has also worked with MacFarlane on episodes of Family Guy, providing voices for several characters on the show. He also has appeared as the character Scooby/Wayne on multiple episodes of The Shield.

Career

Film and TV work
In addition to Ted, Wu has appeared in the feature films Hot Tub Time Machine (as Mr. Wang), Juwan Chung's Baby (2008) (as the first Wah Ching gangster), Kung Phooey (as Lo Fat), and Phil Gorn's S.F. (as Detective Yee). He also appeared as a translator in the squad of four in Stephane Gauger's Chinatown Squad, written by Baby co-star Feodor Chin, and starring Chin as well as other Baby co-star David Huynh.

He is probably most known for his recurring role on the TV show Family Guy as Mr. Washee Washee. Survivors remorse he regularly appears as Chen, a Chinese shoe executive.  The Shield as Scooby / Wayne. Other TV shows he has appeared on include It's Always Sunny in Philadelphia (as the Man in the episode "The Gang Gets Trapped"), Good Luck Charlie (as Tim), Criminal Minds (as Paul Jones), The Defenders (as ADA Gow), Rubicon (as Chair Bumper Guy), The Good Guys (as Lee Huang),  Bones (as James Sok), 7th Heaven (as Doctor Thomas Quawn), George Lopez (as Andrew), Threshold (as Philip Choi), Numb3rs (as Raymond Hmong), Clubhouse (as Von), Robbery Homicide Division (as Binh Joe/Bobby Poon), Boston Public (as Younger Man), Nash Bridges (as Consulate Guard) and the Chinese TV series Tou du.

Video game voice work
Wu has also provided his voice talents to videogames such as Resident Evil 6, Ace Combat: Assault Horizon, MAG, L.A. Noire, Dead to Rights: Retribution, No More Heroes 2: Desperate Struggle, X-Men Origins: Wolverine (the voice of David Nord/Agent Zero), Metal Gear Solid 4: Guns of the Patriots, GoldenEye: Rogue Agent, and Jet Li's Rise to Honor.

Filmography

Film

Television

Video games

References

External links

Official Site of Actor Robert Wu

American male video game actors
Living people
American male film actors
American male television actors
American male voice actors
American male actors of Chinese descent
Year of birth missing (living people)